Alfredo Lenci (1873–1959) was an Italian cinematographer. After working as a cinematographer on a number of historical epics during the silent era, Lenci was later employed by the state-owned Istituto Luce on documentary and propaganda films such as Black Shirt (1933).

Selected filmography
 Fabiola (1918)
 The Crusaders (1918)
 A Dying Nation (1922)
 Messalina (1924)
 Black Shirt (1933)

References

Bibliography 
 Poppi, Roberto. I film: Tutti i film italiani dal 1930 al 1944. Gremese Editore, 2005.

External links 
 

1873 births
1959 deaths
Italian cinematographers
Film people from Rome